The 2006–07 season is FC Vaslui's 5th season of its existence, and its second in a row, in Liga I. With only 8 players from the previous season, FC Vaslui started the season with a new coach, and without a sponsor. A few players from the relegated FCM Bacău, were signed, with also a few foreign players. The new coach was Gheorghe Mulţescu. The team started very bad, and it seemed the previous season, will repeat. However, after a 1–1 draw with Poli Iasi, Mulţescu was sacked and the new coach was named Viorel Hizo. Also, in the same time, Adrian Porumboiu revealed, that he did not leave FC Vaslui, and he was sponsoring it in secret. Hizo made one of the strongest team, in that moment, taking the team, from 17th place, to 7th place in the end of the first half of the season. But because the most important two players left the team, in the winter break  Marius Croitoru and Viorel Frunză, the team did not play as same as the end of the first half of the season. In the end, FC Vaslui finished 8th in Liga I. Adrian Porumboiu wanted Hizo to be the team manager in the next season, but because of the team's poor infrastructure, he decided to leave FC Vaslui, for Ceahlaul.

First-team squad

Statistics

Appearances and goals
Last updated on 23 May 2007.

|-
|colspan="12"|Players sold or loaned out during the season
|-

|}

Top scorers

Disciplinary record

Overall

{|class="wikitable"
|-
|Games played || 35 (34 Liga I, 1 Cupa României)
|-
|Games won || 13 (13 Liga I)
|-
|Games drawn ||  12 (11 Liga I, 1 Cupa României)
|-
|Games lost || 10 (10 Liga I)
|-
|Goals scored || 41
|-
|Goals conceded || 44
|-
|Goal difference || –3
|-
|Yellow cards || 79
|-
|Red cards || 5
|-
|Worst discipline ||  Ştefan Apostol with 8 yellow cards
|-
|Best result || 3–1 (H) v Oţelul Galaţi – Liga I – 15 Oct 20063–1 (A) v Jiul Petroşani – Liga I – 11 Nov 20062–0 (H) v Jiul Petroşani – Liga I – 19 May 2007
|-
|Worst result || 2–5 (H) v UTA Arad – Liga I – 5 Aug 20060–3 (A) v Gloria Bistriţa – Liga I – 20 Sep 2006
|-
|Most appearances ||  Ştefan Apostol with 32 appearances
|-
|Top scorer ||  Viorel Frunză (10 goals)
|-
|Points || 50/102 (49.01%)
|-

Performances
Updated to games played on 23 May 2007.

Goal minutes
Updated to games played on 23 May 2007.

Liga I

League table

Results summary

Results by round

Matches

Cupa României
Kick-off listed in local time (EET)

FC Vaslui seasons
Vaslui